NEOGEO Station was a brand by M2 for downloadable Neo Geo games that were previously available to be purchased from the PlayStation Store for Sony's PlayStation 3 (PS3), PlayStation Portable (PSP) and PlayStation Vita (PSV) video game consoles in all regions. All games in this series have been de-listed from the PlayStation Store. This list does not include PlayStation games ported from Neo Geo that were released as PS One Classics.

References

SNK Playmore
PlayStation Store
Neo Geo games on PlayStation Store